N. candida  may refer to:
 Nesta candida, a sea snail species
 Nymphaea candida, an aquatic perennial herbaceous plant species native to quiet freshwater habitats in Eurasia

See also
 Candida (disambiguation)